The Embryo's In Bloom is Dog Fashion Disco's third album, originally released on OuterLoop Records in 1998, then reissued in 2000 before going out of print in 2001. The studio quality of this album is noticeably better than the band's preceding albums, and they were subsequently pleased with the resulted sound. It was re-released by Rotten Records in 2006.

Track listing

Album information
The track "A Corpse Is A Corpse" is omitted from the track listing, but is not omitted from the sleeve.
As with Experiments in Alchemy, tracks 3-8 were re-recorded and appear on later albums in some form.
The title comes from a line in the song "God Crisis".
This is the only Dog Fashion Disco release to not feature horns.

Track information
"G Eye Joe" and "A Corpse Is A Corpse" are re-recorded songs from their first album, Erotic Massage.
"9 to 5 at the Morgue" and "The Satanic Cowboy" are re-recorded songs from their second album Experiments in Alchemy.

Personnel
Todd Smith - Vocals
Greg Combs - Guitars
Stephen Mears - Bass
Sennen Quigley - Keyboards, Guitar
John Ensminger - Drums

Additional personnel
Tom Baker - Mastering
Drew Mazurek - Recording, Co-Producer, Mixing
Jake Mossman - Assistant Mixer
Mike Rippe - Assistant Mixer

References

2000 albums
Dog Fashion Disco albums